The Americas Zone was one of the three zones of the regional Davis Cup competition in 1997.

In the Americas Zone there were four different tiers, called groups, in which teams compete against each other to advance to the upper tier. Winners in Group II advanced to the Americas Zone Group I. Teams who lost their respective ties competed in the relegation play-offs, with winning teams remaining in Group II, whereas teams who lost their play-offs were relegated to the Americas Zone Group III in 1998.

Participating nations

Draw

 and  relegated to Group III in 1998.
 promoted to Group I in 1998.

First round

Cuba vs. Peru

Puerto Rico vs. Colombia

Paraguay vs. Haiti

El Salvador vs. Uruguay

Second round

Colombia vs. Peru

Paraguay vs. Uruguay

Relegation play-offs

Puerto Rico vs. Cuba

El Salvador vs. Haiti

Third round

Colombia vs. Uruguay

References

External links
Davis Cup official website

Davis Cup Americas Zone
Americas Zone Group II